Malachi Sylvanus Hogan (April 16, 1878 – March 4, 1945) was a Major League Baseball outfielder who played for one season. He played in one game for the Cleveland Blues on August 13 during the 1901 Cleveland Bluebirds season.

External links

1878 births
1945 deaths
Cleveland Blues (1901) players
Major League Baseball outfielders
Baseball players from Ohio
Concord Marines players